Motormouth is a British children's Saturday morning TV magazine show that ran from 1988 from 1992.

Motormouth or Motor Mouth may also refer to:

 Motormouth (U.S. TV program), an American hidden camera television program that aired on VH1 in 2004
 Motormouth (comics), a Marvel UK comics character
 "Motor Mouth", a song from the American musical comedy TV show The Naked Brothers Band
 "Motormouth" Mike Morgan, a commentator from the Gorgeous Ladies of Wrestling
 "Motormouth" Lisa Ruddy, a cast member of You Can't Do That on Television
 John Moschitta Jr. (born 1954), American spokesperson known for rapid speaking